Moorhouse is a surname. Originating in Normandy France. It was carried to England in 1066 when Norseman helped William the Conqueror seize the English Crown. As reward they were given lands in Lancashire. Progressing to Yorkshire and eventually to Ireland, Moorhouse surname came to Canada in the 1700s with William Moorhouse settling in Ontario Canada. Moorhouse surname progressed to United States and Australia from England. 

Notable people with the surname include:

 Adrian Moorhouse (born 1964), English swimmer
 Anthony Moorhouse (1935–1956),  British soldier kidnapped and killed in Port Said after the Suez Crisis
 Bert Moorhouse (1894–1954), American actor
 Frank Moorhouse (1938–2022), Australian writer
 Geoffrey Moorhouse (1931–2009), British author
 George Moorhouse (1901–1943), American-British footballer
 Harry Moorhouse (1872–1934), British Army officer and cricketer
 James Moorhouse (1826–1915), Anglican Bishop of Melbourne and Manchester
 James Moorhouse (politician) (1924–2014), British politician
 Justin Moorhouse (born 1970), comedian and broadcaster
 Len Moorhouse (1904–1970), New Zealand representative swimmer
 Malcolm Moorhouse (1866–1955), English-born cricketer in New Zealand 
 Matilda Moorhouse Barratt (1837–1902), a prominent member of The Church of Jesus Christ of Latter-day Saints
 Matthew Moorhouse (1813–1876), medical practitioner, pastoralist, civil servant and the first Protector of Aborigines in South Australia
 Robert Moorhouse (1866–1921), English cricketer
 Roger Moorhouse (born 1968), historian
 Stan Moorhouse  (1891–1951), British rugby league footballer
 William Sefton Moorhouse ( 1825–1881), New Zealand politician
 William Barnard Rhodes-Moorhouse (1887–1915), his nephew, the first airman to be awarded the Victoria Cross

See also 
 Moorehouse, a surname
 Morehouse (disambiguation)

English-language surnames